John Hamlin Borrer (date of birth unknown – 1854) was an English cricketer.  Borrer's batting style is unknown.  Though his date of birth is unknown, it is known he was christened at Henfield, Sussex on 2 March 1817.

While studying at the University of Oxford, Borrer made his first-class debut for Oxford University against the Marylebone Cricket Club in 1837.  The following season he played a second first-class match for Oxford University against the same opposition, with both matches coming at Lord's.  In that same year he made a single first-class appearance for Sussex against Kent at the Old County Ground, West Malling.  He batted at number eleven in Sussex's first-innings, scoring 1 not out, while in their second-innings he was promoted to open the batting, scoring 6 runs before he was dismissed by Alfred Mynn.  Borrer later made a first-class appearance for Petworth against the Marylebone Cricket Club at Lord's in 1845.  He had little success in this match, scoring 2 runs at number eleven in Petworth's first-innings, before he was stumped by William Dorrinton off the bowling of William Lillywhite, while in Petworth's second-innings ended not out on 1.

He died at the village of his christening sometime in 1854.  He was the nephew of the botanist William Borrer.

References

External links

1854 deaths
People from Henfield
Alumni of Brasenose College, Oxford
English cricketers
Oxford University cricketers
Sussex cricketers
Petworth cricketers
Year of birth unknown